Mäkkylä is a station on the VR commuter rail network, between the cities of Helsinki and Espoo in Finland. It is situated between Pitäjänmäki railway station and Leppävaara railway station and is about nine kilometres northwest of Helsinki Central railway station.

History 
The locals of western Leppävaara had made requests regarding the opening of a halt on the rantarata numerous times since 1912; Mäkkylä was opened on 15 June 1940 on this initiative. The name was proposed by the Finnish State Railways in honor of the crown estate of Mäkkylä, from which the land around the railway in the area was gained. Initially, only westbound trains stopped on the halt due to a nearby steep incline causing issues for departing eastbound trains. Another platform for eastbound trains was eventually constructed and opened for traffic on 28 October of the same year.

The Vermo harness racing track was opened close by in 1977; previously, special trains were driven to Mäkkylä on race days. The Mäkkylä–Vermo connection was enhanced in the spring of 1983 with the opening of the pedestrian underpass on the western side of the halt.

The station was entirely rebuilt as part of the Leppävaara City Line project in 1999–2002. The station was designed by architect Kauko Lahti, while Teräsbetoni Oy was chosen as the contractor.

Services 

Both lines make stops at all stations on their routes.

Exchanging onto HSL buses is possible on the Mäkkylän asema bus stops on the immediate western side of the station on the Turuntie street. Park and ride services are provided with two parking lots, one on the northeastern side of the station on Fonseenintie and another on the southwestern side on Perkkaantie. The latter is also accompanied by a city bike terminal.

Previously, travellers to Mäkkylä from Espoo could use an Espoo internal ticket, and travellers from Helsinki could use a Helsinki internal ticket. However YTV changed this, and after 28 August 2005 Mäkkylä is considered within Espoo. As a result, travellers from Helsinki require a regional ticket. In the present, Mäkkylä and its surrounding bus stops are part of HSL fare zone .

External links
 
 Train arrivals and departures at Mäkkylä on Finrail

References 

Leppävaara
Railway stations in Espoo
Railway stations opened in 1940